Paygah-e Roodmahi is a village in Nosratabad Rural District, in the Central District of Zahedan County, Sistan and Baluchestan Province, Iran. At the 2006 census, its population was 29, in 7 families.

References 

Populated places in Zahedan County